Wanda Plaza is a complex of two supertall skyscrapers in Kunming, Yunnan, China. The towers are called Fanya International Finance Building North and Fanya International Finance Building South. Construction began on 3 June 2012 and ended in 2016.

See also
List of tallest buildings in China

References

Skyscrapers in Kunming
Buildings and structures under construction in China
Skyscraper office buildings in China